The men's giant slalom competition of the Sochi 2014 Olympics was held at the Rosa Khutor Alpine Resort near Krasnaya Polyana, Russia, on 19 February.

Results
The first run was started at 11:00 and the second run at 14:30.

References

Giant slalom